Stephen H. Glickman (born June 25, 1948) is a senior judge of the District of Columbia Court of Appeals, the highest appellate court for the District of Columbia. After graduating from law school, he worked as a law clerk on the Supreme Court of Connecticut and a seminar instructor at Yale University before moving to Washington, D.C., where he worked at the Federal Trade Commission's Bureau of Competition and the Public Defender Service for the District of Columbia. From 1980 until 1999, he worked at the law firm Zuckerman Spaeder, serving as managing partner from 1991 to 1998.  He retired from the active service on June 25, 2022.

Glickman resides in Washington D.C. with his wife, Ann. He has two children and one grandchild.

References

1948 births
Living people
20th-century American judges
21st-century American judges
Cornell University alumni
Judges of the District of Columbia Court of Appeals
Lawyers from Washington, D.C.
People from Brooklyn
Yale Law School alumni